Professional Military Education (PME) refers to the professional training, development, and schooling of military personnel. It encompasses many schools, universities, and training programs designed to foster leadership in military service members.

Further reading
Cope, J.A. (1995). International Military Education and Training: An Assessment. Washington, DC: Institute for National Strategic Studies, National Defense University
Higbee, D. (ed.) (2010) Military Culture and Education. Burlington, VT: Ashgate.
Kennedy, G.C. and Neilson, K. (eds.) (2002) Military Education: Past, Present, and Future. (2002) Westport, CT: Praeger.
Kvernbekk, T., Simpson, H. and Peters, M.A. (eds) (2008) Military Pedagogies: And why they matter. Rotterdam: Sense Publishers.
Sepúlveda, I. (2011) La Educación de la Seguridad y la Defensa en las Américas. Washington, DC: William J. Perry Center for Hemispheric Defense Studies.
Syme-Taylor, V. and Jalili, D. (2018) “Professional Military Education.” In: Galbreath, D. and Deni, J. (Eds.) Routledge Handbook on Defence Studies, pp.98-112. Abingdon: Routledge.
Van Creveld, M. (1990) The Training of Officers: From Military Professionalism to Irrelevance. New York, NY: The Free Press.
Watson, C.A. (2007) Military Education: A Reference Handbook. Westport, CT: Praeger Security International.

See also
Professional military education in the United States Air Force
Enlisted Professional Military Education (EPME)
Joint Professional Military Education

Military education and training in the United States